In mathematics, the constant sheaf on a topological space  associated to a set  is a sheaf of sets on  whose stalks are all equal to . The constant presheaf with value  is the presheaf that assigns to each non-empty open subset of  the value , and  all of whose restriction maps are the identity map .

In certain cases, the set  may be replaced with an object  in some category  (e.g. when  is the category of abelian groups, or commutative rings).

Constant sheaves of abelian groups appear in particular as coefficients in sheaf cohomology.

Basics
Let  be a topological space, and  a set. The sections of the constant sheaf  over an open set  may be interpreted as the continuous functions , where  is given the discrete topology. If  is connected, then these locally constant functions are constant.

A detailed example

The constant presheaf with value , which we will denote , is the presheaf that chooses all four sets to be , the integers, and all restriction maps to be the identity.  is a functor, hence a presheaf, because it is constant.  satisfies the gluing axiom, but it is not a sheaf because it fails the local identity axiom on the empty set.

A similar presheaf  that satisfies the local identity axiom over the empty set is constructed as follows. Let , where 0 is a one-element set. On all non-empty sets, give  the value .

Notice that as a consequence of the local identity axiom for the empty set, all the restriction maps involving the empty set are boring.  This is true for any presheaf satisfying the local identity axiom for the empty set, and in particular for any sheaf.

To enlarge it so that it satisfies the gluing axiom, let . Let  and  be the two projection maps . Because  is a ring and all the restriction maps are ring homomorphisms,  is a sheaf of commutative rings.

See also 
Locally constant sheaf

References

Section II.1 of 
Section 2.4.6 of 

Sheaf theory